Madison Whitekiller is an American of Native ancestry who was crowned the 2017-18 Miss Cherokee on August 26, 2017. She will represent the Cherokee Nation as a goodwill ambassador to promote the history, language, and culture of the Cherokee tribe for the next year.

She competed against six other young women for the Miss Cherokee crown in a competition held each year in conjunction with the Cherokee National Holiday.  The competition judges contestants on their use of the Cherokee language, their cultural and platform presentations, and their responses to impromptu questions.  For her cultural presentation during the competition, Whitekiller focused on empowering Cherokee women through the traditional Cherokee story of why the corn husk doll has no face.

Whitekiller, from Claremore, Oklahoma, is a student at Northeastern State University in Tahlequah, Oklahoma.   She previously served as Junior Miss Cherokee 2015-16.

References

External links
Young and Cherokee - Madison Whitekiller

Living people
People from Claremore, Oklahoma
Northeastern State University alumni
Cherokee Nation artists
Year of birth missing (living people)
21st-century Native Americans